is a Japanese actress, voice actress and singer. She had her first major voice acting roles in 2007, voicing Jasmine in Deltora Quest and Lucia Nahashi in Venus Versus Virus.

Her career as a musician began with her performance of the opening themes of the anime series First Love Limited in April 2009. In the same month, she and three other voice actresses debuted as the musical group Sphere with their single "Future Stream". She announced her marriage on her blog on August 22, 2019.

Voice acting career
Takagaki has a fairly wide acting range, from little kids to romantic teens to gentle weak girls to elder sister types to proper young ladies to boyish girls to serious young women.

She had her first major role as voice actor in 2007, providing the voice of Jasmine, a main character of the anime series Deltora Quest. She was subsequently featured in Venus Versus Virus and Da Capo II as Lucia Nahashi and Asakura Otome, respectively., as well as Feldt Grace in Mobile Suit Gundam 00.

She went on to voice Noe Isurugi in the 2008 series True Tears and held a leading role in S · A: Special A, proving the voice of Megumi Yamamoto. She later took the roles of Nina Antalk, in Chrome Shelled Regios and Ein, in Phantom: Requiem for the Phantom, in 2008. Later that year, she was cast as Alesta Blanket in Fight Ippatsu! Jūden-chan!! and as Sumika Murasame, protagonist of Sasameki Koto.  Takagaki also reprised her role as Feldt Grace in the second half of Mobile Suit Gundam 00.

In addition to voice acting, Takagaki has also appeared on camera. She, Aki Toyosaki, Haruka Tomatsu, and Minako Kotobuki appeared on the  television show as a narrator on April 6, and as part of Sphere on April 20, 2009, and July 27, 2009, and by herself.

Musical career
Takagaki graduated from a music college in Tokyo, with a major in operatic singing. Her first musical performance was the opening theme of the 2009 First Love Limited series, titled "Future Stream" with Aki Toyosaki, Haruka Tomatsu, and Minako Kotobuki. Shortly after, the four formed the musical group Sphere. They are affiliated with Music Ray'n, an artist management and publishing group of Sony Music Entertainment Japan. The theme was released as the group's first single on April 22, 2009. In July, the anime series Sora no Manimani debuted with the Sphere performed opening theme "Super Noisy Nova", which was released as a single on July 29, 2009. Sphere released their third single "It Raises the Wind/Brave my heart" on November 25, 2009. The group released their first album Atmosphere on December 23, 2009. After, the group performed "Realove:Realife", the opening theme of Ichiban Ushiro no Daimaō, which aired in April 2010.

Filmography

Anime
2005
Fushigiboshi no Futagohime – Mirlo
2006
Ouran High School Host Club – Tsubaki Kamigamo, Female college student, Benio's fan
Fushigiboshi no Futagohime Gyu! – Mirlo

2007
Baccano! – Sylvie Lumiere
Da Capo II – Asakura Otome
Deltora Quest – Jasmine, Girl
Mobile Suit Gundam 00 – Feldt Grace
Venus Versus Virus – Lucia Nahashi
Gakuen Utopia Manabi Straight! – Sweets student, Upper classman, Student
Kenkō Zenrakei Suieibu Umishō – Asami Oyamada, Karenna Nanjō, Female student
Goshūshō-sama Ninomiya-kun – Young Shungo, Boy
Toward the Terra – Artella
Hell Girl: Two Mirrors – Kitazaki

2008
S · A: Special A – Megumi Yamamoto, Yuki-pon, Takishima family maid, and others
Mobile Suit Gundam 00 Second Season – Feldt Grace
Net Ghost PiPoPa – Azusa Sakamoto, Karin Yukitani, Pu/Seiren (singing voice)
True Tears – Noe Isurugi
Da Capo II Second Season – Asakura Otome
Slayers Revolution – Girl
Kyō no Go no Ni – Tsubasa Kawai
Allison & Lillia – Meg
Itazura na Kiss – Mari Horiuchi
Pocket Monsters: Diamond & Pearl – Chinatsu (ep 76)
Rental Magica – Male student, Female student
Skip Beat! – Miya (ep 4)
Macademi Wasshoi! – Baltia
Ayakashi – Natsuhara
Mokke – Gouda
Battle Spirits: Shounen Toppa Bashin – Suiren, My Sunshine
Yozakura Quartet – Mina Tatebayashi
Hell Girl: Three Vessels – Jun Moriyama
Our Home's Fox Deity. - Shunta Hashimoto (ep 22)

2009
Chrome Shelled Regios – Nina Antalk
Fight Ippatsu! Jūden-chan!! – Alesta Blanket
Phantom: Requiem for the Phantom – Ein (Elen)
Sasameki Koto – Sumika Murasame
Heaven's Lost Property – Mikako Satsukitane
Inazuma Eleven – Touko Zaizen
Canaan – Nene
Zan Sayonara Zetsubou Sensei – Oora Kanako
Kobato. – Haruka
Sora no Manimani – Miki Makita, Sayuri Minami
Yumeiro Patissiere – Reiko-sensei(ep 6-7)
Zoku Natsume Yūjin-chō – Midori
Student Council's Discretion – Female student
Maria-sama ga Miteru 4th Season - Miyuki

2010
Durarara!! – Erika Karisawa
The Qwaser of Stigmata – Ayana Minase
Hanamaru Kindergarten – Hiiragi
Transformers Animated – Arcee, Teletran I
Occult Academy – Ami Kuroki
The Legend of the Legendary Heroes – Ferris Eris
Mitsudomoe – Mitsuba Marui
Durarara!! Specials – Erika Karisawa
Asobi ni Iku yo! – Ichika
Heaven's Lost Property Forte – Mikako Satsukitane
Mobile Suit Gundam 00 the Movie: Awakening of the Trailblazer – Feldt Grace

2011
Blue Exorcist – Kuro
Heaven's Lost Property the Movie: The Angeloid of Clockwork – Mikako Satsukitane
Chihayafuru – Taichi Mashima (young)
No. 6 – Ann (ep 5)
Mitsudomoe Zouryouchuu! – Mitsuba Marui
Mobile Suit Gundam AGE – Decil Galette
Beelzebub – Kouta Kunieda, Nene Omori
Inazuma Eleven GO – Kurama Norihito
Manyuu Hikenchou – Kyouka Manyuu
Nekogami Yaoyorozu – Yurara Makuragi
Sket Dance – Kyouko Nanba (ep 36)
Kamisama Dolls – Moyako Somaki
Un-Go – Motoko Tanimura
Softenni - Shiki Nishioka
Pokémon the Movie: Black—Victini and Reshiram and White—Victini and Zekrom – Moguryuu

2012 
Daily Lives of High School Boys – Tadakuni's younger sister
Natsuiro Kiseki – Saki Mizukoshi
Symphogear – Chris Yukine
Inazuma Eleven GO Chrono Stone – Kurama Norihito, Manto, Tasuke
Tari Tari – Wakana Sakai
Nekogami Yaoyorozu: Ohanami Ghostbusters (OVA) – Yurara Makuragi
Natsuiro Kiseki: 15-kaime no Natsuyasumi (OVA) – Saki Mizukoshi
Sword Art Online – Lisbeth/Rika Shinozaki
Fate/Zero Second Season – Shirley
Natsuyuki Rendezvous – Quiz Reporter
Cardfight!! Vanguard Season 2: Asia Circuit – Takuto Tatsunagi
Blue Exorcist: The Movie – Kuro
Sword Art Offline -Lisbeth/Rika Shinozaki 

2013
Arata: The Legend – Kotoha
Hakkenden: Eight Dogs of the East – Hamaji
The World God Only Knows – Yui Goido, Mars
Photo Kano – Yūko Uchida
Senki Zesshō Symphogear G – Chris Yukine
Silver Spoon – Tamako Inada 
Inazuma Eleven GO Galaxy – Mizukawa Minori, Lalaya Obies
I Couldn’t Become a Hero, So I Reluctantly Decided to Get a Job. – Herself
Non Non Biyori – Honoka Ishikawa (ep 4)
Koitabi: True Tours Nanto – Aoi Shindou
Log Horizon – Henrietta
Gaist Crusher – Luminella Hotaru
Chihayafuru 2 – Rion Yamashiro
Wanna be the Strongest in the World – Jumbo Yamamoto
Yozakura Quartet ~Hana no Uta~ – Mina Tatebayashi
Yozakura Quartet: Tsuki ni Naku – Mina Tatebayashi
Cardfight!! Vanguard Season 3: Link Joker – Takuto Tatsunagi, Student B
Magi: The Kingdom of Magic – Myron Alexius
Sanjougattai Transformers Go! – Tobio Fuuma

2014
Inazuma Eleven GO Galaxy – Seren Melvil, Despina Laks
Blade & Soul – Dan Roana
Black Butler: Book of Circus – Doll/Freckles
Heaven's Lost Property Final: Eternal My Master – Mikako Satsukitane
Gundam Reconguista in G – Manny Anbasada, Nobell
Sword Art Online II – Lisbeth/Rika Shinozaki
Spo-chan Taiketsu: Youkai Daikessen – Jin
Tokyo Ghoul – Itori
Terra Formars (OVA) – Zhang Ming-Ming
Log Horizon 2 – Henrietta
Akatsuki no Yona – Son Hak (young)
Girlfriend (Kari) – Tsugumi Harumiya

2015
Durarara!!x2 Shou – Erika Karisawa
Durarara!!x2 Shou: Watashi no Kokoro wa Nabe Moyou – Erika Karisawa
Tokyo Ghoul √A - Ayato Kirishima (childhood; ep 5)
Magic Kaito 1412 – Megumi Furuhata (ep.17)
JoJo's Bizarre Adventure: Stardust Crusaders – Mariah (ep 30-32)
Dog Days" – Farine
Vampire Holmes – Holmes' house cat Kira & Christina
Jewelpet: Magical Change – Larimer
Re-Kan! – Yuuki Inoue
Symphogear GX –  Chris Yukine
Ultimate Otaku Teacher – Tim Berners Lynn
Plastic Memories – Sarah (ep 10-12)
Durarara!!x2 Ten – Erika Karisawa
Ushio and Tora – Jun Moritsuna

2016
Norn 9 - Mikoto Kuga
Gate 2nd Season - Arpeggio El Lelena
Haruchika - Makoto Yamanobe (ep 11)
Durarara!!x2 Ketsu - Erika Karisawa
Neko mo, Onda-ke - Natsuko Onda & Sachiko Onda
The Morose Mononokean - Zenko Fujiwara
Ushio & Tora 2nd Season - Jun Moritsuna
Beyblade Burst - Daina Kurogami
Gintama°: Aizome Kaori-hen (OVA) - Hotaru

2017
Sword Art Online The Movie: Ordinal Scale - Lisbeth/Rika Shinozaki
Blue Exorcist: Kyoto Impure King Arc - Kuro
Beyblade Burst God - Daina Kurogami
Fukumenkei Noise, Miou Suguri
Kirakira PreCure a la Mode, Crystal Bunny
Senki Zesshō Symphogear AXZ – Chris Yukine
Two Car – Hitomi Iseki
Land of the Lustrous – Jade
Garo: Vanishing Line - Meifang

2018
The Seven Deadly Sins: Revival of The Commandments - Derieri
Sword Art Online: Alicization - Lisbeth/Rika Shinozaki
Tokyo Ghoul:re - Itori

2019
Kakegurui XX - Sumika Warakubami
Star Twinkle PreCure - Kaede Amamiya
Senki Zesshō Symphogear XV – Chris Yukine

2020
Somali and the Forest Spirit – Praline
Auto Boy - Carl from Mobile Land – Carl

2021
Idoly Pride – Aoi Igawa
Log Horizon: Destruction of the Round Table – Henrietta
Mars Red – Misaki
Tropical-Rouge! Pretty Cure – Elda

2022
Healer Girl – Ria Karasuma
Crayon Shin-chan: Mononoke Ninja Chinpūden – Chinzō Hesogakure
Nights with a Cat – Kyuruga
Akiba Maid War – Cafe Manager
Arknights: Prelude to Dawn – Frostnova

2023
Urusei Yatsura – Ryunosuke
Make My Day – Marie

Video games
Imabikisou (2007) – Ami
Mobile Suit Gundam 00 Gundam Meisters (2008) – Feldt Grace
 Da Capo II: Plus Situation (2008) – Asakura Otome
Harvest Moon DS: Grand Bazaar (2008) – Freya, Saniya
Dungeons and Dam (2009) – Fear 
Saikin Koi Shiteru? (2009) - Miharu Sakurano
Sekirei: Gifts from the Future (2009) – Yahan
Heaven's Lost Property Forte: Dreamy Season (2011) – Mikako Satsukitane
Girlfriend (Kari) (2012) – Tsugumi Harumiya
Guilty Crown: Lost Christmas (2012) – Past
ZombiU (2012) - Sondra Kelley (Japanese dub)
Photo Kano Kiss (2013) – Yuko Uchida
Norn9 (2013) – Mikoto Kuga
Sword Art Online: Infinity Moment (2013) – Lisbeth
Norn9 Var Commons (2014) – Mikoto Kuga
Sword Art Online: Hollow Fragment (2014) – Lisbeth
Super Heroine Chronicle (2014) – Chris Yukine
Norn9 Last Era (2015) – Mikoto Kuga
Sword Art Online: Lost Song (2015) – Lisbeth
Kobayashi ga Kawai Sugite Tsurai!! (2015) – Megumu Kobayashi and Mitsuru Kobayashi
JoJo's Bizarre Adventure: Eyes of Heaven (2015) - Mariah
Sword Art Online: Hollow Realization (2016) – Lisbeth
Granblue Fantasy (2016) – Nemone, Garuda
Horizon Zero Dawn (2017) – Aloy (Japanese dub)
Senki Zesshō Symphogear XD Unlimited (2017) – Chris Yukine
Marvel's Spider-Man (2018) – Black Cat/Felicia Hardy
Onmyoji (2018) – Senhime
The Seven Deadly Sins: Grand Cross (2019) - Derieri
Fire Emblem Heroes (2021) – Dagr
Genshin Impact (2021) – Aloy
JoJo's Bizarre Adventure: All Star Battle R (2022) – Mariah
Horizon Forbidden West (2022) – Aloy (Japanese dub)
Sword Art Online: Last Recollection (2023) – Lisbeth

Dubbing

Live-action
10,000 BC (Evolet (Camilla Belle))
The Broken Hearts Gallery (Lucy Gulliver (Geraldine Viswanathan))
Euphoria (Ruby "Rue" Bennett (Zendaya))
Gossip Girl (2007) (Sage (Sofia Black-D'Elia))
Gossip Girl (2021) (Monet de Haan (Savannah Lee Smith))
Hearts Beat Loud (Sam Fisher (Kiersey Clemons))
Iris (Kim Hyun-jun (young) and later Yang Mi-jung (Hyun Jyu-ni))
It Chapter Two (Adult Beverly Marsh (Jessica Chastain))
Power Rangers Mystic Force (Clare/the Gatekeeper (Antonia Prebble))
Scream 4 (Kirby Reed (Hayden Panettiere))
Sucker Punch (Amber (Jamie Chung))
Terminator: Dark Fate (Daniella "Dani" Ramos (Natalia Reyes))
We Are Lady Parts (Saira (Sarah Kameela Impey))

Animation
Epic (Mary Katherine)
Smurfs: The Lost Village (Smurfwillow)
Tinpo (Dougpo)

Photobooks

Discography

Albums

Solo mini-albums

Solo singles

Concerts

References

External links

 
 
Official agency profile 

1985 births
Living people
Anime singers
Japanese female idols
Japanese women pop singers
Japanese video game actresses
Japanese voice actresses
Singers from Tokyo
Sony Music Entertainment Japan artists
Voice actresses from Tokyo
21st-century Japanese actresses
21st-century Japanese singers
21st-century Japanese women singers